Thomas Pridgin Teale may refer to:
Thomas Pridgin Teale (died 1867) (1800–1867), British surgeon
Thomas Pridgin Teale (died 1923) (1831–1923), British surgeon, son of the above